Randall (Randy) Bass is an associate professor of English and vice provost at Georgetown University, and Executive Director of Center for New Design of Learning & Scholarship (CNDLS).
He was visiting scholar at Ball State University.

He is an expert in the Scholarship of Teaching and Learning.

Works

 Border texts: cultural readings for contemporary writers, Houghton Mifflin, 1999, 
 Beyond borders: a cultural reader, Houghton Mifflin, 2002,

References

Literary critics of English
Living people
Georgetown University faculty
Year of birth missing (living people)
American academics of English literature
Place of birth missing (living people)